The 1994 Miami Hooters season was the third season for the Miami Hooters. They finished the 1994 season 5–7 and were the only team in the National League to not make the playoffs.

Regular season

Schedule

Standings

Awards

References

Florida Bobcats seasons
1994 Arena Football League season
Miami Hooters Season, 1994